Arthur G. Erwin was an American football player and coach. He played college football at Yale University, lettering in 1905 and 1906. Erwin served as the head football coach at Sewanee: The University of the South in 1907, compiling a record of 8–1.

Head coaching record

References

Year of birth missing
Year of death missing
American football guards
Sewanee Tigers football coaches
Yale Bulldogs football players